Victor Salvatore Ferla Davidson (born 8 November 1950) is a Scottish retired professional footballer. He played in midfield.

Glasgow-born Davidson grew up in Calton and Bridgeton. He attended school at Sacred Heart R.C., where he played in the same football team as future musician Frankie Miller. In 1967, he signed as a schoolboy player with Celtic and was given his first-team debut in 1970. He played only sporadically over the next five years before being transferred to Motherwell in 1975. After three season with the Well, he signed for English club Blackpool. In March 1979, Celtic bought Davidson from Blackpool for £35,000. The following year, he moved to the United States, where he signed with the Phoenix Inferno of the Major Indoor Soccer League. He finished the season ranked third in goals. In 1982, he moved to the Cleveland Force. Davidson was slowed by a leg injury during the 1983–84 season and the Force released him at the end of the season. After no other MISL teams expressed an interest in him, he signed with the Canton Invaders of the American Indoor Soccer Association. That year, the Invaders won the league title.

Since he retired, Davidson has been coaching at the Scottsdale Soccer Club in Arizona.

See also
List of Cleveland Force (1978-1988) players

References

External links

Profile at ScottsdaleSoccer.com
MISL stats

1950 births
Living people
Footballers from Glasgow
American Indoor Soccer Association players
Blackpool F.C. players
Canton Invaders players
Celtic F.C. players
Cleveland Force (original MISL) players
Major Indoor Soccer League (1978–1992) players
Motherwell F.C. players
Phoenix Inferno players
Scottish footballers
Scottish expatriate footballers
Scottish Football League players
English Football League players
Association football midfielders
People from Bridgeton, Glasgow
Scottish people of Italian descent